Humberto Delgado III (born 10 March 2000) is a United States Virgin Islands international soccer player who plays as a midfielder.

Career statistics

International

References

External links
 

2000 births
Living people
United States Virgin Islands soccer players
United States Virgin Islands international soccer players
Association football midfielders